Manzonia carboverdensis is a species of minute sea snail, a marine gastropod mollusk or micromollusk in the family Rissoidae.

References

carboverdensis
Gastropods of Cape Verde
Gastropods described in 1987